Glennmary is a historic home located near South Boston, Halifax County, Virginia. It was built in 1837–1840, and is a -story, three bay, side hall plan, gable roofed brick dwelling in the Greek Revival style. It has a -story, one bay, side wing. The front facade features a one-story pedimented Greek Doric order portico. Also on the property are the contributing slave quarters, a log cabin, a smokehouse, and sheds.

It was listed on the National Register of Historic Places in 1979.

References

Houses on the National Register of Historic Places in Virginia
Greek Revival houses in Virginia
Houses completed in 1840
Houses in Halifax County, Virginia
National Register of Historic Places in Halifax County, Virginia
U.S. Route 58
Slave cabins and quarters in the United States